Ichthyostomatogasteridae is a family of mites belonging to the order Mesostigmata.

Genera:
 Asternolaelaps Berlese, 1923
 Japanasternolaelaps Hirschmann & Hiramatsu, 1984
 Archaeopodella Athias-Henriot, 1977

References

Acari